Edward Freeman (7 December 1860 – 16 October 1939) was an English cricketer. He played for Essex between 1894 and 1896. He was also the curator of Leyton Cricket Ground and worked as a coach and groundsman at Sherborne School.

References

External links

1860 births
1939 deaths
English cricketers
Essex cricketers
People from Lewisham
Cricketers from Greater London